George Ogden Abell (March 1, 1927 – October 7, 1983) was an American educator. Teaching at UCLA, priorly he worked as a research astronomer, administrator, as a popularizer of science and of education, and as a skeptic. He earned his B.S. in 1951, his M.S. in 1952 and his Ph.D. in 1957, all from the California Institute of Technology.  He was a Ph.D. student under Donald Osterbrock. His astronomical career began as a tour guide at the Griffith Observatory in Los Angeles.  Abell made great contributions to astronomical knowledge which resulted from his work during and after the National Geographic Society - Palomar Observatory Sky Survey, especially concerning clusters of galaxies and planetary nebulae.  A galaxy, an asteroid, a periodic comet, and an observatory are all named in his honor.  His teaching career extended beyond the campus of UCLA to the high school student oriented Summer Science Program, and educational television.  He not only taught about science but also about what is not science. He was an originating member of the Committee on Scientific Investigation of Claims of the Paranormal now known as the Committee for Skeptical Inquiry.

Early life
George Ogden Abell was born in Los Angeles on March 27, 1927, to Theodore Curtis Abell and Annamarie (Ogden) Abell. Theodore Abell was born in Waterbury, Connecticut, in 1890, was a Unitarian minister, and was one of the original members of the Hollywood Humanist Society.  Annamarie was born in Kansas City, Missouri, in 1896, and studied to be a librarian, worked for a short while as a librarian but eventually became a social worker.  George Ogden Abell was named for his mother's brother, George Ogden.

Theodore and Annamarie divorced when Abell was 6 years old.  Annamarie and son went to live with her father, also George Ogden, who was an author of western novels.  Theodore maintained regular contact with Abell and took him to many museums and to Griffith Observatory and planetarium when he was about 8, soon after it opened.  This prompted Abell to start reading books on astronomy.  Abell attended Van Nuys High School where he achieved all As in all math and science courses that he took.

As a youth, Abell held many part-time jobs, he had a newspaper delivery as well as mail route, worked in a bowling alley, a restaurant, grocery store, and did home maintenance work.

Military service
Abell enlisted in the US Army Air Corps after he graduated from high school in 1945 in the waning days of World War II.  He took the tests that qualified him for training as a pilot, navigator or bombardier, however the war ended and those schools were shut down before he could begin training.

Instead, he went to weather school at Chanute Field in Illinois.  On finishing that, he had the option of staying at Chanute Field to attend forecasting school, however, that would have entailed becoming an officer and staying in the army longer.  Since the war was over, getting out of the army as soon as possible seemed more important to him, so he opted to forego forecasting school.  Instead he was sent to Japan where he served as an Air Corps weatherman for six months before being discharged after 18 months of total service.

Education
Upon leaving the Air Corps, Abell returned to Los Angeles and worked as a gas station attendant while waiting to start school at the California Institute of Technology (Caltech).  At Caltech, Abell studied physics his freshman year.  However, the next year Caltech inaugurated its astronomy department and as a sophomore he switched majors to astronomy.  As an undergraduate student, Abell lived in Caltech's Fleming House and bowled on  the Fleming House bowling team.  Abell participated in the Drama Club, and was president of the club for one year.  He also wrote the music column for Caltech's weekly newspaper, The California Tech, and worked at Griffith Observatory as a guide while an undergrad student.

Abell received his Bachelor of Science degree in astronomy in 1951.  He then continued at Caltech for graduate studies in astronomy.  He received a Master of Science in 1952 and a Ph.D. in 1957. He was the first Ph.D. student of Donald Osterbrock.  During his graduate student days he worked at Griffith Observatory as a lecturer.

Career

Palomar sky survey
Abell's first professional astronomical occupation came as a Caltech grad student when he was an observer on the National Geographic Society – Palomar Observatory Sky Survey.  Several scientific advances came out of this work including,
 The Abell catalog of 2,712 rich clusters of galaxies, "...a seminal contribution to observational cosmology".
 The recognition of second order clusters of the clusters of galaxies, which also disproved Carl Charlier's hierarchical model.
 The study of luminosity of clusters showing how they can be used for determination of relative distances.
 A list of 86 planetary nebulae which includes Abell 39.
 Recognition that planetary nebulae derive from red giant stars, together with Peter Goldreich, of UCLA,
 With Robert G. Harrington discovered periodic comet 52P/Harrington-Abell.

An extended version of the clusters of galaxies catalogue was published after Abell's death in 1987 under the authorship of Abell, Harold G. Corwin and Ronald P. Olowin.  This extended  catalog includes clusters seen from the southern hemisphere, lists approximately 4,000 clusters of galaxies and includes thirty members with a redshift up to z = 0.2.  (See List of Abell clusters.)

Teaching

UCLA
Abell taught at the University of California, Los Angeles (UCLA) for 17 years where he was known as an outstanding and brilliant teacher.  He believed that the cornerstone of teaching science is to present how and why the facts are known to be facts; and not in the mere presentation of facts that might amaze, sensationalize, entertain but not enlighten the listener.

Abell chaired the UCLA Astronomy Department for seven years 1968 to 1975.  He also served on several university committees and commissions, such as,
 Faculty Senate
 Committee on Parking and Transportation (1959)
 Chairman of the Graduate Council (1964-1965)
 Chairman of the Committee on Athletics (1968-1969)
 Chairman of the Los Angeles Division (1972-1973)

During the period of student unrest in the 1960s Abell was an active member and organizer of the unofficial Committee for Responsible University Government.  This was due to his belief that faculty and administration standards were weakening as a result of the unrest.

Summer science program

Abell was a leader and teacher in the Summer Science Program for talented high school students.  At Thatcher School in Ojai, California, he and others taught college-level physics, mathematics and astronomy to these students.  A number of them went on to pursue distinguished careers in science.  One such is Ed Krupp the long-time director of Griffith Observatory in Los Angeles.

Other teaching methods
Abell also lectured at other venues, specifically at many small colleges that lacked astronomy departments.  He also strove to bring the stories of science and astronomy to the people through public lectures.

He wrote several books including Exploration of the Universe a textbook widely used in undergraduate astronomy courses.

He helped produce educational TV programs/series such as Project Universe and Understanding Space and Time.  He also appeared in some of these as himself, an astronomer.  Project Universe was a 30 part introductory course on astronomy that featured Ed Krupp director of Griffith Observatory in Los Angeles.  Abell and Julian Schwinger created Understanding Space and Time in 16 parts to explain in layman's terms celestial mechanics, relativity, and the large scale structure of the universe.

Skepticism
Abell was not just a teacher of astronomy and science, he also taught about popular topics with no scientific evidence.  He was a debunker of astrology, pseudoscience, and the occult.  In a tribute to Abell in The Quarterly Journal of the Royal Astronomical Society, Lawrence H. Aller wrote,

His opposition to such forces took many forms, in writings, and in television appearances.  He was one of the co-founders of the Committee on Scientific Investigation of Claims of the Paranormal now known as CSI, the Committee for Skeptical Inquiry.

Abell was a contributor to the organization's journal Skeptical Inquirer.

Astronomical namesakes
There are several astronomical bodies named for George Abell, as well as an earthbound observatory.
 The Abell Galaxy, discovered by Abell was the largest known astronomical object for many years
 Asteroid (3449)Abell
 Periodic comet 52P/Harrington-Abell, which Abell co-discovered with Robert Harrington
 George Abell Observatory, Open University, Milton Keynes, United Kingdom

Affiliations

 American Astronomical Society
 Councilor 1969-1972
 Education Committee, Chairman
 Astronomical Society of the Pacific
 President 1969-1971
 Member Board of Directors 1982-1984
 Royal Astronomical Society, elected a Fellow in 1970
 International Astronomical Union
 Cosmology Commission, President
 Organized symposia on the large-scale structure of the universe
 UCLA – 1979
 Crete – 1982
 American Association for the Advancement of Science, Member of the governing board
 Summer Science Program
 Academic Director 1960-1983
 Guest speaker in other years

Personal life
Abell was married twice.  The first marriage occurred right after his graduation from Caltech.  His first wife was a school teacher and they had two sons together named Anthony and Jonathan.  This marriage ended after 19 years with the sons remaining with their father.  Abell's second wife, Phyllis, was a painter who studied three years at the Philadelphia Museum School of Art but did not graduate.

Abell enjoyed many hobbies during his lifetime such as, softball, bowling, music concerts and grand opera (on which he was considered an authority), record collecting, and literature.  He was an avid baseball fan, frequently in attendance at Los Angeles Dodgers games.

Abell died at home on October 7, 1983, after suffering a heart attack.

Selected published works
  (PhD Thesis)

Journal articles
 
 
 
 
 
 
 
 
 
 
 
 
 
 
 
 

He was slated to take over as editor of the Astronomical Journal effective January 1, 1984, but his death occurred before that appointment became effective.

Filmography

See also
 List of Abell clusters
 
 Abell catalogue
 :Category:Abell objects
 Abell Catalog of Planetary Nebulae

Obituaries
 JRASC 77 (1983) L85
 QJRAS 30 (1989) 283
 University of California: In Memoriam, 1985

Notes

References

External links 

 Oral history for George Abell (14 November 1977), American Institute of Physics

 
1927 births
1983 deaths
Discoverers of comets
American astronomers
20th-century American educators
American skeptics
Summer Science Program
University of California, Los Angeles faculty
California Institute of Technology alumni
Military personnel from California
United States Army Air Forces soldiers
United States Army Air Forces personnel of World War II